The 2017 IIHF Women's World Championship Division II was three international ice hockey tournaments organised by the International Ice Hockey Federation. The Division II Group A tournament was played in Gangneung, South Korea, from 2 to 8 April 2017, the Division II Group B tournament was played in Akureyri, Iceland, from 27 February to 5 March 2017, and the Division II Group B Qualification tournament was played in Taipei, Taiwan, from 12 to 17 December 2016.

Venues

Division II Group A

Participants

Match officials
4 referees and 7 linesmen were selected for the tournament.

Referees
 Vanessa Morin
 Anna Kuroda
 Chelsea Rapin
 Rita Rygh

Linesmen
 Tanja Cadonau
 Aiko Hoshi
 Jenni Jaatinen
 Lee Kyung-sun
 Lee Tae-ri
 Bente Owren
 Brienne Stewart

Final standings

Results
All times are local (UTC+9).

Awards and statistics

Awards
Best players selected by the directorate:
Best Goalkeeper:  Han Do-hee
Best Defenseman:  Kayleigh Hamers
Best Forward:  Pia Pren
Source: IIHF.com

Scoring leaders
List shows the top skaters sorted by points, then goals.

GP = Games played; G = Goals; A = Assists; Pts = Points; +/− = Plus/minus; PIM = Penalties in minutes; POS = Position
Source: IIHF.com

Goaltending leaders
Only the top five goaltenders, based on save percentage, who have played at least 40% of their team's minutes, are included in this list.

TOI = Time on Ice (minutes:seconds); SA = Shots against; GA = Goals against; GAA = Goals against average; Sv% = Save percentage; SO = Shutouts
Source: IIHF.com

Division II Group B

Participants

Match officials
4 referees and 7 linesmen were selected for the tournament.

Referees
 Katalin Gérnyi
 Elena Ivanova
 Henna-Maria Koivuluoma
 Gabriela Malá

Linesmen
 Veronika Dopitová
 Linn Forsberg
 Leigh Hetherington
 Senovwa Mollen
 Oksana Shestakova
 Julia Tschirner
 Julia Weegh

Final standings

Results
All times are local (UTC±0).

Awards and statistics

Awards
Best players selected by the directorate:
Best Goalkeeper:  Mónica Renteria
Best Defenseman:  Eva Karvelsdóttir
Best Forward:  Anjali Thakker
Source: IIHF.com

Scoring leaders
List shows the top skaters sorted by points, then goals.

GP = Games played; G = Goals; A = Assists; Pts = Points; +/− = Plus/minus; PIM = Penalties in minutes; POS = Position
Source: IIHF.com

Leading goaltenders
Only the top five goaltenders, based on save percentage, who have played at least 40% of their team's minutes, are included in this list.

TOI = Time on Ice (minutes:seconds); SA = Shots against; GA = Goals against; GAA = Goals against average; Sv% = Save percentage; SO = Shutouts
Source: IIHF.com

Division II Group B Qualification

Participants

Match officials
3 referees and 5 linesmen were selected for the tournament.

Referees
 Ma Sang-hee
 Etsuko Wada
 Laura White

Linesmen
 Sayaka Akama
 Ashleigh Davidson
 Elizabeth Mantha
 Theodore Streitu
 Yuka Tochigi

Final standings

Results
All times are local (UTC+8).

Awards and statistics

Awards
Best players selected by the directorate:
Best Goalkeeper:  Nina van Orshaegen
Best Defenseman:  Donne van Doesburgh
Best Forward:  Yeh Hui-chen
Source: IIHF.com

Scoring leaders
List shows the top skaters sorted by points, then goals.

GP = Games played; G = Goals; A = Assists; Pts = Points; +/− = Plus/minus; PIM = Penalties in minutes; POS = Position
Source: IIHF.com

Leading goaltenders
Only the top five goaltenders, based on save percentage, who have played at least 40% of their team's minutes, are included in this list.

TOI = Time on Ice (minutes:seconds); SA = Shots against; GA = Goals against; GAA = Goals against average; Sv% = Save percentage; SO = Shutouts
Source: IIHF.com

See also
List of sporting events in Taiwan

References

External links
Official website of IIHF

Division II
2017
2017 IIHF Women's World Championship Division II
2017 IIHF Women's World Championship Division II
2017 IIHF Women's World Championship Division II
IIHF Women's World Championship Division II
IIHF Women's World Championship Division II
IIHF Women's World Championship Division II
2017 IIHF Women's World Championship Division II
2017 IIHF Women's World Championship Division II
2017 IIHF Women's World Championship Division II
2010s in Taipei
February 2017 sports events in Europe
March 2017 sports events in Europe
April 2017 sports events in Asia
December 2016 sports events in Asia